Karlshrue College is an English language school in Colombo, Sri Lanka, located at Karlshrue Place, Colombo. It has 500 students and 17 teachers, with an auditorium and a swimming pool. 
The School is situated at 5, Karlshrue Place, Colombo-10, Sri Lanka.
The Principal is Sali Devon.

The school teaches history and is mentioned in the Galle Fort, Dutch Fort and Dutch period museum histories. The School has a connection with Wesley College, Colombo and Southland Balika. Some graduates have entered the Universities in Sri Lanka.

The School closed its business in 2010.

Provincial schools in Sri Lanka
Schools in Colombo